Rubra, red in Latin, may refer to :
 Rubra, an Edenist serpent, a character of the Night's Dawn trilogy
and also :
 Folliculitis rubra, a genodermatose
 Granulosis rubra nasi, a rare familial disease of children occurring on the nose, cheeks, and chin
 Lochia rubra, the cruenta, the first post-partum vaginal discharge red in color because of the large amount of blood it contains
 Miliaria rubra, a skin disease marked by small and itchy rashes
 Pityriasis rubra pilaris, the Devergie's disease, lichen ruber acuminatus or lichen ruber pilaris, a group of chronic disorders characterized by reddish orange, scaling plaques and keratotic follicular papules
 Saxa Rubra, a village and station on the Flaminian Way 9 miles from Rome
 Terra Rubra, a place in Maryland, United States
 Turritopsis rubra, a type of jellyfish
 Ulmus rubra, the slippery elm